Klub Piłkarski Chemik Police, commonly referred to as Chemik Police, is a football club based in Police near Szczecin, Poland.

History of club names 
 1968–1991 - KS Chemik Police
 1992–1993 - Polger Police
 1993–1999 - MKS Chemik Police
 1999–2001 - Pomerania Police
 2001–2008 - KP Police
 2008–present - KP Chemik Police

Footnotes

External links 

 Official club website  
 Chemik Police at the 90minut.pl   
 KP Chemik Police in Polish Wikipedia  

Association football clubs established in 1968
1968 establishments in Poland
Football clubs in West Pomeranian Voivodeship
Police County